Planodion (Vagrant, Greek: Πλανόδιον) is a Greek literary periodical published by the poet Yiannis Patilis since 1986.

History and profile
The first issue of Planodion came out in December 1986, edited by the poet Yiannis Patilis, who was then working as a philologist in a public middle school. Its editor already had a ten-year experience in literary journals and magazines, having already participated in the publication of To Dentro (1978), Nisos – Music and Poetry (1983–1985) and Critique and Texts (1984–1985). Planodion started as a quarterly journal, but from issue 12 onwards (June 1990) it became biannual.

The publication of Planodion had as its starting point the special interest of its editor for the philological kind of literary journals, which traditionally blossoms in Greece, along with his desire “to discover and promote noteworthy intellectual and artistic presences, while at the same time to form an autonomous field for gathering and expression of literary and critical interests.” (1). As it is also noted, «Planodion is a particular literary journal which has marked its own special stigma on the domain of literature [...] mainly on its impact, given the prestige and the love that distinguishes the editor and his colleagues in literature»(2).

Character / Content 
Up to its fifth issue (Winter '87-'88) the journal had already formed its editorial character, which from then on it is broadly outlined with a four-part content structure, which steadily falls into the following order in each issue:
(a) The first part consists of original poetic and prose works, emphasizing on Greek literature.
(b) The second part is titled “Subjects” and there appear in a more complete form and after a long and intensive preparation, translations of poetry, short stories or essays from global literature. In this part writers such as Philip Larkin, Umberto Saba, Walt Whitman, René Wellek, Mikhail Bakhtin, Paul Celan etc. have been presented, while some authors became known or were presented for the first time in Greek letters at length, such as Joseph Brodksy, Edward Said, Gary Snyder, Anatol Baconsky, Yury Olesha, Douglas Dunn, Ueda Akinari, Shiga Naoya, Tobias Wolff and others. Anthologies of contemporary Italian and German poetry have also been presented in this part, while the following writers have given interviews to the magazine: Galway Kinnell, Edward Said, Gary Snyder, Alasdair Gray, Ricardo Piglia.
(c) In the third part, under the eloquent title “The Great Panhellenic” writings from the broad spectrum of Greek language, whose language form and special point of view start an indirect dialogue with the particularities of the modern Greek problematics, are published or republished.
(d) Each issue closes with a fourth part, consisting of essays, book critiques and commentaries, under the general title “Accounts”. Its very rich material (1/3 of the whole issue approximately) consists of critiques by prominent Greek authors and critics, regular contributors of the journal, in which they cast their critical eye on phenomena of the contemporary Greek culture, mainly works of literature, but also on the public stance of people and institutions that have to do with what we broadly name politics of culture. In this prism, and according to the stated intentions of its editor, the magazine “has a political stance and is imbued with the belief that the artistic and cultural phenomenon, even of the most consciously isolated artist, constitutes a public responsibility act due to the social nature of the material and the notions it deals with.”(3).
In December 2008, preparing a special issue on the Russian poet Anna Akhmatova the editor of the magazine with the contribution of the researcher Giorgos Zevelakis and the writer Iro Nikopoulou4 revealed the conditions of the death of Andrei Gorenko, Anna Akhmatova's brother, political refugee in 1919 in Greece, who committed suicide in February 1920 in Athens, and his tomb was discovered. (5,6)

Today
The magazine has reached its 52nd issue thus far (June 2012). Every two years it completes a volume and 12 volumes are already in circulation, consisting of approximately 9.000 pages. Moreover, each issue of the magazine includes complete literary editions, most usually poetry books by young poets, and the subscribers of the magazine receive them free of charge.

Internet presence 
	The first 42 issues of the magazine have been digitized by the National Book Centre of Greece, where one can delve into them.
	In April 2010 the magazine launched a webpage dedicated exclusively to flash fiction, Greek and foreign, under the general title Bonsai Stories (7).

References 
1 According to the editor's note in the National Book Centre of Greece.

2 Dimitra Chaloulou, The Literary Journal “Planodion”.

3 See footnote 1.

4 For the history of the discovery of the tomb by Iro Nikopoulou.

5 The discovery as presented by TV 100 channel in St. Petersburg on 29-09-2009.

6 See also the narration of Eugenia Kritseftskaya in the Russian page www.greekorbis.gr.

7 See footnote 1.

External links 
 National Book Centre
 Dimitra Chaloulou, The Literary Journal “Planodion”
 Bonsai Stories

1986 establishments in Greece
Biannual magazines
Literary magazines published in Greece
Greek-language magazines
Magazines established in 1986
Modern Greek literature
Quarterly magazines